Giulio Belinzaghi (17 October 1818 – 28 August 1892) was an Italian politician. He was mayor of Cernobbio, Province of Como, Lombardy (1864–1868). He was twice mayor of Milan (1867–1884, 1889–1892). He served in the Senate of the Kingdom of Italy. He was a recipient of the Order of Saints Maurice and Lazarus.

References

1818 births
1892 deaths
19th-century Italian politicians
Members of the Senate of the Kingdom of Italy
Recipients of the Order of Saints Maurice and Lazarus
Mayors of Milan
People from Cernobbio